Chung Wing Kwong (鍾榮光, 1866–1942) was a scholar and revolutionist in China.  He devoted most of his life in Lingnan University, being the first Chinese principal of the university, and revolution of China.

Life
He was born in Siu Lam of Heung Shan (Chung Shan or Zhongshan), Kwungtung, China 1866 and lived in Hong Kong when he was young.

See also
 Lingnam Dr. Chung Wing Kwong Memorial Secondary School

External links
The life of Dr. Chung Wing Kwong (in Chinese)
Lingnam Dr. Chung Wing Kwong Memorial Secondary School (in Chinese)

1866 births
1942 deaths
Chinese revolutionaries
Educators from Guangdong
People from Zhongshan
Presidents of Lingnan University (Guangzhou)
Academic staff of Lingnan University (Guangzhou)